Parliamentary elections were held in Guatemala on 14 August 1994, following the premature dissolution of Congress during the 1993 constitutional crisis, and in view of implementing constitutional reforms approved in January 1994. The result was a victory for the Guatemalan Republican Front, which won 33 of the 80 seats. Voter turnout was just 21%.

The 1993 constitutional crisis started on 25 May 1993, when the then President Jorge Serrano Elías attempted a self-coup or autogolpe. Serrano suspended the constitution, dissolved Congress and the Supreme Court, imposed censorship and tried to restrict civil liberties. Serrano's actions were met with broad national and international opposition and ruled "illegal" by the Constitutional Court of Guatemala, following which Serrano was forced to resign.

Results

References

Bibliography
 Villagrán Kramer, Francisco. Biografía política de Guatemala: años de guerra y años de paz. FLACSO-Guatemala, 2004.
 Political handbook of the world 1994. New York, 1995.
 Elections in the Americas A Data Handbook Volume 1. North America, Central America, and the Caribbean. Edited by Dieter Nohlen. 2005.

Elections in Guatemala
1994 elections in Central America
1994 in Guatemala